Rebecca Henderson may refer to:

 Rebecca Henderson (actress), Canadian actress
 Rebecca M. Henderson, American economist
 Rebecca McConnell (née Henderson), Australian mountain biker
 Rebecca Henderson (racewalker), Australian racewalker